Saint Francis of Assisi was a friar and the founder of the Order of Friars Minor.

Saint Francis of Assisi may also refer to:

Churches 
St. Francis of Assisi Church (disambiguation)
Church of San Francisco (disambiguation) for churches with Spanish language titles
Church of San Francesco (disambiguation) for churches with Italian language titles

Schools 
St. Francis of Assisi Elementary, a Catholic elementary (K-7) school in Vancouver, Canada
St Francis of Assisi Catholic Technology College, a secondary school in Walsall, England
St. Francis of Assisi Convent High School, a high school located in Navsari, Gujarat, India
St. Francis of Assisi Elementary School, a Catholic School within the Archdiocese of Louisville, USA
The Academy of St Francis of Assisi, a secondary school in Liverpool, England

Other 
The city of San Francisco, named in 1776 through the Mission San Francisco de Asís
Sisters of St. Francis of Assisi, a Roman Catholic religious order for women
Saint François d'Assise, a 1983 opera by Olivier Messiaen
Saint Francis of Assisi (film), a 1944 Mexican film
 Francis of Assisi (film), a 1961 film
Saint Francis of Assisi, 1923 book by G. K. Chesterton

See also
Francis, Duke of Cádiz (1822–1902), king consort of Spain